Minab is a city in Hormozgan Province, Iran.

Minab may also refer to:
 Minab, Chaharmahal and Bakhtiari
 Minab, Sistan and Baluchestan
 Minab County, in Hormozgan Province

See also
 Mosques and Imams National Advisory Board (MINAB)